William A. Jeffreys House is a historic plantation house located near Youngsville, Franklin County, North Carolina.  It was built about 1842, and is a Federal style frame dwelling consisting of a two-story central block with flanking one-story wings. It has a Greek Revival style interior finish.

It was listed on the National Register of Historic Places in 1976.

References

Plantation houses in North Carolina
Houses on the National Register of Historic Places in North Carolina
Houses completed in 1842
Federal architecture in North Carolina
Greek Revival houses in North Carolina
Houses in Franklin County, North Carolina
National Register of Historic Places in Franklin County, North Carolina